Zahme Gera is a river of Thuringia, Germany. At its confluence with the Wilde Gera in Plaue, the Gera is formed.

See also
List of rivers of Thuringia

Rivers of Thuringia
Rivers of Germany